Purchase-to-pay, often abbreviated to P2P and also called req to check/cheque, refers to the business processes that cover activities of requesting (requisitioning), purchasing, receiving, paying for and accounting for goods and services.  Most organisations have a formal process and specialist staff to control this activity so that spending is not wasteful or fraudulent.

References

Transaction processing